Feather moss, or Hypnales, is an order of leafy mosses.

Feather moss, feathermoss, or feather-moss may also refer to:

 Amblystegium confervoides, tiny feather-moss
 Amblystegium humile, constricted feather-moss
 Amblystegium radicale, swamp feather-moss
 Amblystegium serpens, creeping feather-moss
 Amblystegium varium, willow feather-moss
 Brachythecium albicans, whitish feather-moss
 Brachythecium appleyardiae, Appleyard's feather-moss
 Brachythecium erythrorrhizon, redfoot feather-moss
 Brachythecium glaciale, snow feather-moss
 Brachythecium glareosum, streaky feather-moss
 Brachythecium mildeanum, sand feather-moss
 Brachythecium plumosum, rusty feather-moss
 Brachythecium populeum, matted feather-moss
 Brachythecium reflexum, reflexed feather-moss
 Brachythecium rivulare, river feather-moss
 Brachythecium rutabulum, rough-stalked feather-moss
 Brachythecium salebrosum, smooth-stalk feather-moss
 Brachythecium starkei, Starke's feather-moss
 Brachythecium trachypodium, Lawers feather-moss
 Brachythecium velutinum, velvet feather-moss
 Campyliadelphus chrysophyllus, golden feather-moss
 Campyliadelphus elodes, fine-leaved marsh feather-moss
 Campylium protensum, dull starry feather-moss
 Campylium stellatum, yellow starry feather-moss
 Campylophyllum calcareum, chalk feather-moss
 Campylophyllum halleri, Haller's feather-moss
 Cirriphyllum cirrosum, tendril feather-moss
 Cirriphyllum crassinervium, beech feather-moss
 Cirriphyllum piliferum, hair-pointed feather-moss
 Conardia compacta, compact feather-moss
 Drepanocladus polygamus, fertile feather-moss
 Eurhynchium meridionale, Portland feather-moss
 Eurhynchium pulchellum, elegant feather-moss
 Eurhynchium striatulum, lesser striated feather-moss
 Eurhynchium striatum, common striated feather-moss
 Helodium blandowii,  Blandow's feathermoss
 Herzogiella seligeri, Silesian feather-moss
 Herzogiella striatella, Muhlenbeck's feather-moss
 Homalia trichomanoides, blunt feather-moss
 Homalothecium lutescens, yellow feather-moss
 Homalothecium sericeum, silky wall feather-moss
 Homomallium incurvatum, incurved feather-moss
 Hygroamblystegium fluviatile, brook-side feather-moss
 Hygroamblystegium tenax, fountain feather-moss
 Hygroamblystegium tenax, fountain feathermoss
 Homomallium incurvatum, incurved feathermoss
 Homalothecium sericeum, silky wall feathermoss
 Hylocomium splendens splendid feathermoss
 Kindbergia praelonga, common feathermoss
 Leptodictyum riparium, Kneiff's feathermoss
 Oxyrrhynchium hians, Swartz's feather-moss
 Oxyrrhynchium schleicheri, twist-tip feather-moss
 Oxyrrhynchium speciosum, showy feather-moss
 Platyhypnidium alopecuroides, Portuguese feathermoss
 Platyhypnidium riparioides, Long-beaked water feathermoss
 Pleurozium schreberi, red-stemmed feathermoss
 Pseudoscleropodium purum, neat feathermoss
 Ptilium crista-castrensis, ostrich-plume feathermoss
 Rhynchostegiella curviseta, curve-stalked feather-moss
 Rhynchostegiella litorea, scabrous feather-moss
 Rhynchostegiella pumila, dwarf feather-moss
 Rhynchostegiella tenella, tender feather-moss
 Rhynchostegiella teneriffae, Teesdale feather-moss
 Rhynchostegium confertum, clustered feather-moss
 Rhynchostegium megapolitanum, megapolitan feather-moss
 Rhynchostegium murale, wall feather-moss
 Rhynchostegium rotundifolium, round-leaved feather-moss
 Thamnobryum alopecurum, fox-tail feathermoss
 Thamnobryum angustifolium, Derbyshire feathermoss
 Thamnobryum cataractarum, Yorkshire feather-moss

See also
Moss (disambiguation)